Bedok Lighthouse (Chinese: 勿洛灯塔) is an active  lighthouse facility located at the southeastern coast of Singapore. The lighthouse is located on top of a 26-storey condominium at Lagoon View Block 5000K Singapore 449292, Marine Parade Road.

It can be observed visually as a "red concrete cubicle".

History 

Singapore's first automated, unmanned lighthouse, Bedok lighthouse stands at 76 metres above sea level. It began operating on 9 August 1978 and its 600,000 candle light beam was reported to be visible at sea for up to 42 km. It cost $225,000 and was a replacement for the Fullerton Lighthouse on top of Fullerton Building, which would be obscured by high-rise buildings in what is now the Marina Bay area.

In 2014, a call for tender to build a new lighthouse atop the 25-storey high Block 3, Marine Terrace was put out by Maritime and Port Authority of Singapore. This block was chosen to replace Bedok Lighthouse and would have been operational by the third quarter of 2015. However, the lighthouse still remained on the condominium as of 2020. It would be the first lighthouse atop an HDB block.

See also

 List of lighthouses in Singapore

Notes

References 

Lighthouses completed in 1979
Lighthouses in Singapore
20th-century architecture in Singapore